Sander Gillé and Joran Vliegen were the reigning champions from when the tournament was last held in 2019, but chose not to participate this year.

Marc-Andrea Hüsler and Dominic Stricker won the title, defeating Szymon Walków and Jan Zieliński in the final, 6–1, 7–6(9–7).

Seeds

Draw

Draw

References

External links
 Main Draw

Swiss Open Gstaad - Doubles
2021 Doubles